The Count of Charolais (German:Der Graf von Charolais) is a 1922 German silent historical film directed by Karl Grune and starring Eva May, William Dieterle and Eugen Klöpfer. The film was adapted from the play of the same name by Richard Beer-Hofmann.

The film's sets were designed by the art directors Karl Görge and Robert Neppach.

Cast
 Eva May as Désirée  
 William Dieterle as Junge Charolais  
 Eugen Klöpfer as Senatspräsident  
 Maria Forescu
 Georg Baselt 
 Paul Biensfeldt as Herbergswirt  
 Wilhelm Diegelmann 
 Hugo Döblin 
 Carl Geppert 
 Leonhard Haskel 
 Hildegard Imhof 
 Fred Immler as Tambour  
 Joseph Klein as Graf von Charolais  
 Arthur Kraußneck 
 Margarete Kupfer as Alte Barbara  
 Adolf E. Licho as Wucherer  
 Fritz Richard 
 Rudolf Rittner as Hauptmann Romont  
 Josef Schelepa 
 Ferdinand von Alten as Graf Philipp  
 Max Wilmsen

References

Bibliography
 James Robert Parish & Kingsley Canham. Film Directors Guide: Western Europe. Scarecrow Press, 1976.

External links

1922 films
Films of the Weimar Republic
Films directed by Karl Grune
German silent feature films
German films based on plays
Films set in the 15th century
Films set in France
German black-and-white films
German historical films
1920s historical films
1920s German films